Movie Central was a Philippine pay television channel created by ABS-CBN and one of the freemium channels of ABS-CBN TVplus. The channel's programming consists of mainly foreign and Hollywood movies. It was the second digital terrestrial television-exclusive movie channel after Cine Mo!, which also airs Hollywood and foreign movies in original English audio. Movie Central operated daily from 7:00 AM to 1:00 AM of the following day. It was available for a free-trial basis from July 30, 2018 to May 5, 2020, alongside O Shopping (standalone DTV), Asianovela Channel, Jeepney TV, and Myx.

Movie Central permanently ceased broadcasting on May 5, 2020 due to the cease-and-desist order issued by the National Telecommunications Commission (NTC) and Solicitor General Jose Calida against ABS-CBN. On September 10, 2020, the NTC reclaimed all frequencies assigned to ABS-CBN.

Most of the films aired on Movie Central were moved to Kapamilya Channel via Movie Central Presents movie presentation block which airs during late night hours, exclusive to pay cable and satellite television, replacing O Shopping.

Final programming

Content
Movie Central carried films from various Hollywood film studios (Walt Disney Studios, 20th Century Studios, Warner Bros. Pictures, Paramount Pictures, Columbia Pictures, Universal Pictures, Metro-Goldwyn-Mayer and selected independent film studios).

Programming blocks
 Action Zone – a weekday early-evening showcase of mostly action films.
 Date Night – a programming block dedicated primarily to romantic films.
 Hit Play Now – blockbuster movies from various genres are presented.
 Thriller Theater – a late-night programming block featuring mostly horror and suspense movies.
 Movie Blowout – a Saturday night block showcasing well-loved blockbuster movies.
 Sunday Double Rumble – a Sunday night block featuring two movies of the same genre.
 The Rundown - a documentary block featuring two movies of the same genre, airing back-to-back every Monday night.

References

External links
 

ABS-CBN Corporation channels
Assets owned by ABS-CBN Corporation
Creative Programs
Movie channels in the Philippines
English-language television stations in the Philippines
Television networks in the Philippines
Defunct television networks in the Philippines
Television channels and stations established in 2018
2018 establishments in the Philippines
Television channels and stations disestablished in 2020
2020 disestablishments in the Philippines